Telluride may refer to:

Telluride, Colorado, the county seat of San Miguel County in southwest Colorado
Telluride Ski Resort, a ski resort located in Mountain Village, Colorado
Telluride Film Festival, a film festival that takes place in Telluride, Colorado
Telluride (chemistry), the tellurium anion and its derivatives
Telluride mineral, any mineral that has the telluride ion as its main component
Telluride Association, an educational non-profit organization in the United States
Telluride House, a Cornell University residential society and one of the Telluride Association's programs
"Telluride" (song), by Tim McGraw, 2001; covered by Josh Gracin, 2008
Kia Telluride, a mid-size crossover SUV made by Kia Motors

See also

:Category:Tellurides